Irati is a 2022 Basque-language Spanish-French epic fantasy adventure film directed by  which stars Eneko Sagardoy alongside Edurne Azkarate and Itziar Ituño, among others.

Plot 
Set in the 8th century, against the backdrop of the ongoing Christianization of remote areas around the Pyrenees, the plot tracks Eneko (son to a Basque chieftain who died in the wake of a battle with Charlemagne), who helms a group of Christian and Muslim warriors guided by pagan woman Irati, set on finding the body of his father (buried under pagan customs and located next to a hoard) years after the latter's demise, initiating a journey into the forest.

Cast

Production 
Irati is based on the graphic novel El ciclo de Irati, authored by J. L. Landa and J. Muñoz. It boasts a €4.3 million budget, receiving the maximum cap of funding from the Spanish Ministry of Culture.

Shot in Basque, filming wrapped in November 2021. It was shot in the Pyrenees (Navarre and the province of Huesca), including locations such as the Irati Forest, and the Castle of Loarre.

Release 

The film was selected for screening at the 55th Sitges Film Festival, making its presentation on 9 October 2022. Distributed by Filmax, it was set for a 18 November 2022 theatrical release date in Spain. The release was later re-scheduled to 24 February 2023.

Filmax closed international distribution deals with Blue Swan (Italy) and Splendid (Germany).

Reception
On the American review aggregation website Rotten Tomatoes, the film records a 100% approval rating based on 5 reviews from critics, with an average rating of 7.80/10.

Júlia Olmo of Cineuropa described Irati as a "Basque Lord of the Rings, but with a lot less money", and complimented the level of ambition, also writing how it "speaks poetically about timeless human issues", such as "weight of roots, the idea of loyalty and honour, the meaning of identity, the struggle for a place and the value of that struggle, the meaning of faith, the classic concept of 'the beautiful death' (filling one's life with deeds to achieve eternal glory, to be remembered and loved in eternity), the fear of forgetting, the presence of death in life, the search for your origins and the price of that search".

Shelagh Rowan-Legg of Screen Anarchy described it as "a woman's story", otherwise pointing out that it is an unusual film because it manages to combine fantastical elements with a "story grounded to a place and time that is unique and real".

Accolades 

|-
| align = "center" rowspan = "2" | 2022 || rowspan = "2" | 55th Sitges Film Festival || colspan = "2" | Audience Award (Fantàstic Official Selection) ||  || rowspan = "2" | 
|-
| Best Special, Visual or Makeup Effects || || 
|-
| align = "center" rowspan = "5" | 2023 || rowspan = "5" | 37th Goya Awards || Best Adapted Screenplay || Paul Urkijo Alijo ||  || rowspan = "5" | 
|-
| Best Original Score || Aránzazu Calleja, Maite Arroitajauregi ||  
|-
| Best Original Song || "Izena duena bada" by Aránzazu Calleja, Maite Arroitajauregi "Mursego", Paul Urkijo Alijo || 
|-
| Best Costume Design || Nerea Torrijos || 
|-
| Best Special Effects || Jon Serrano, David Heras || 
|}

See also 
 List of Spanish films of 2023

References 

2022 films
2022 adventure films
2020s fantasy adventure films
Films set in the 8th century
Basque-language films
Spanish fantasy adventure films
French fantasy adventure films
Films shot in Navarre
Films shot in the province of Huesca
2020s French films
2020s Spanish films